Kirov is a rural locality (a khutor) in Khakurinokhablskoye Rural Settlement of Shovgenovsky District, the Republic of Adygea, Russia. The population was 100 as of 2018. There are 6 streets.

Geography 
Kirov is located 16 km northeast of Khakurinokhabl (the district's administrative centre) by road. Temirgoyevskaya is the nearest rural locality.

References 

Rural localities in Shovgenovsky District